Force Works was the name of different fictional superhero teams appearing in American comic books published by Marvel Comics.

Publication history
The first version of Force Works appeared in the comic book Force Works #1, (July 1994) created by writers Dan Abnett and Andy Lanning and initially drawn by Tom Tenney. The team was formed from the remains of the West Coast Avengers, after leader Iron Man left the Avengers due to an internal dispute. Force Works maintained a different outlook than that of the Avengers, trying to preempt natural and man-made disasters.

The second version of Force Works was mentioned in Civil War #6.

Fictional team biography

From the ashes of West Coast Avengers
Force Works began shortly after the West Coast Avengers disbanded. Tony Stark, otherwise known as the superhero Iron Man, sought to form a superhero group with a different philosophy than its predecessors (most notably the East Coast branch of the Avengers): they would not just stop disasters, but prevent them. The team was initially composed of Iron Man, U.S. Agent, Spider-Woman (Julia Carpenter), Scarlet Witch, and Wonder Man. By the end of their first mission, Wonder Man was thought dead at the hands of the invading Kree, and shortly thereafter the alien Century became his replacement. The group used a combination of The Chaos Computer (a supercomputer that used incoming information to predict future events) and the hex powers of the Scarlet Witch to attempt to prevent major world problems.

Force Works used a Stark Enterprises facility known as The Works as their base. The building was fully equipped for the team's use; it featured powerful security and stealth systems and incorporated nanotechnology that would repair the building if it were damaged. It was maintained by a Stark Industries staff, leaving Force Works to focus on its duties. The facility was also administered by an artificial intelligence system called P.L.A.T.O. (Piezo-electrical Logistic Analytical Tactical Operator). The Works also included living and training accommodations and could also produce hard-light holographs.

Although Force Works was officially led by the Scarlet Witch, Iron Man would often act insubordinately and make his own decisions during their missions. Later it was revealed that Iron Man was under the influence of the time-traveling villain Kang the Conqueror (even later revealed to be his future self Immortus in disguise). The team fought several battles, existed for just less than two years, and disbanded. Most of its members rejoined the Avengers or sank into obscurity.

Shortly after the disintegration of the group, Tony Stark died in his attempts to regain control of himself from "Kang" and was replaced by a younger, alternate-reality version of himself. The original Stark did not remain dead for long, due to the events that culminated in the "Heroes Reborn" storyline.

Force Works in the Fifty State Initiative
A new version of Force Works was mentioned as being active and sent to Iowa as a part of the Fifty State Initiative. Although no members were shown or even named. According to editor Tom Brevoort on a Newsarama interview it could be that the team consists of new super-heroes, some could be existing "Pro-reg" heroes and some could be established heroes "with an upgrade".

Force Works was again mentioned as a team when War Machine was sent into space to deal with attacking Skrulls. Investigating a Stark satellite, he discovered Cybermancer there, and it was implied by War Machine she was a member of Force Works.

2020 Force Works
In light of an uprising of robots and A.I. during the "Iron Man 2020" event, a new Force Works team becomes formed at the request of the US government to act as the nations last, best line of defense. In East Brunswick, New Jersey, a group of robots associated with the A.I. Army are attacked by Force Works members Solo, Gauntlet, and War Machine where one of them self-destructs. Three hours later, Maria Hill is revealed to be part of Force Works, as its commander, as she meets up with War Machine after the badly-ended mission. She informs him Gauntlet is to be in the hospital for a few weeks and Solo quit because he did not think War Machine was teammate material, and another agent has gone missing. Three hours after her meeting with War Machine, Maria Hill remotely briefs Quake in an airplane on her mission to find the missing agent on the island of Lingare. She informs Quake if the mission fails, then she is to implement the Poseidon Protocols. When the airplane is attacked, Quake is saved by War Machine, while U.S. Agent, her partner piloting the airplane, bails out. Landing in the jungle, he is held at gunpoint by Lingares soldiers until a disguised Mockingbird, the missing agent, rescues him. Quake and War Machine meet up with them as Mockingbird explains she cannot leave the island until her investigative mission is complete, as something huge is happening on it. They are then attacked by Deathloks who soon overwhelm them, and War Machine sends out a priority one distress call asking for assistance.

After War Machine, Quake, U.S. Agent, and Mockingbird have been captured by the Deathloks. All of their equipment has been taken, and they are thrown into a cage with some Lingares soldiers (including those they had fought earlier). Quake starts conversing with the soldiers, explaining their dead captors are Deathloks, then after hearing their story she explains it to War Machine, U.S. Agent, and Mockingbird: When something large appeared and started killing people, someone called the "Scientist" showed up claiming to help them where he made the Deathloks from the fallen countrymen to help deal with the giant. Unfortunately, when their numbers proved insufficient, the Deathloks rebelled, having since started taking prisoners so as to make more of them. Some Deathloks come in to take some more men causing Force Works to fight back, but more Deathloks arrive and they use their electrical guns to stun them. As the Deathloks start to take War Machine, Quake recovers from the paralysis first and starts shaking the ground as hard as she can without her gauntlets. As a Deathlok attacks her and forcing her to stop, something is heard causing the Deathloks to run out of the cage. Quake frees herself and her fellow prisoners, referred to by the Deathloks as "parts". It is then that they discover the giant attacking Lingares is Ultimo. As Quake, U.S. Agent, and Mockingbird get the prisoners to safety, War Machine fights off his paralysis and tries his best to fight the Deathloks trying to experiment on him. Meanwhile, Force Works becomes caught in a three-way fight against Ultimo and the Deathloks. War Machine is then saved by someone the Deathloks call their maker and whom he recognizes, and says is in need of his services. Moments later, War Machine rejoins the rest of Force Works with his armor, U.S. Agent's shield, and the equipment of Quake and Mockingbird and fights off the Deathloks. As Ultimo leaves to pursue the Deathloks, the rest of Force Works learns that War Machine's rescuer is MODOK Superior, and he intends to add his brainpower to Force Works as its newest member.

Having no other choice but for them to work together, MODOK Superior explains to Force Works his prior studies of Ultimo allowed him to make a device that will use radioactive signatures to weaken the robot. Though Lingares doesn't have enough radioactive signatures for them to harness, they will make use of the War Machine's arc reactor as MODOK Superior tells Quake to call Ultimo. She sends out tremors on Lingares, and Ultimo arrives and so does the Deathloks. MODOK Superior explains the Deathloks would only target Ultimo, and tells War Machine to aim the attack towards Ultimo's head. One of the Deathloks speaks in Spanish stating for them to join Ultimo and his creator and even reveals that MODOK Superior had made them for the purpose of capturing Ultimo. Once War Machine gets a clear shot on the head, MODOK Superior reveals his true motives: to connect to Ultimo's headless body to become Ulti-MODOK. Retreating into a bunker, Mockingbird states the Poseidon Protocols will have Quake sink the island if Ultimo can't be stopped, but Quake refuses to do this as there are innocent lives on Lingares. As War Machine tells Force Works he has a plan that doesn't involve killing anybody, Ulti-MODOK assaults the bunker, explaining he found Ultimo asleep beneath Lingares until he awoke him and created the Deathloks when he couldn't stop him on his own. War Machine's plan involves using a generator in the bunker to jump start his armor's arc reactor. Once his arc reactor has been re-energized, James Rhodes has Quake distract Ulti-MODOK in the War Machine armor to buy the rest of Force Works time to figure out how to stop the Deathloks. Rhodes finds the central processor in the command unit as U.S. Agent takes down the bearded Deathlok that has it. The Deathloks are soon controlled by Rhodes after he partially turns himself into a Deathlok to use the command unit. Ulti-MODOK falls into the lava of the chasm that Quake opens as Rhodes has the Deathloks attack and follow him in. Rhodes almost goes in as well due to being under the influence of the Deathlok programing, but is rescued by Mockingbird and U.S. Agent while Quake closes the chasm. A day later at a secure medical facility, Maria Hill reprimands War Machine, U.S. Agent, Mockingbird, and Quake for everything they did that turned the mission into a huge fiasco. After finishing the lecture by revealing she has sent out a scrub team with flamethrowers and EMP guns to destroy the evidence of what happened on Lingares, she fires them from Force Works and takes the flash drive with MODOK's Deathlok plans from U.S. Agent. The rest of the group is against Maria obtaining the Deathlok plans, until Mockingbird deduces U.S. Agent is against it as well, having given Maria an empty drive.

Members
 Iron Man
 Century
 Cybermancer
 Moonraker
 Scarlet Witch
 Spider-Woman
 U.S. Agent
 War Machine
 Wonder Man
 Solo
 Gauntlet
 Mockingbird
 Quake
 Maria Hill

Collections

In other media

Force Works was adapted into the supporting cast of the 1994-1996 Iron Man animated series. This version of the group consists of Iron Man, War Machine, Spider-Woman, the Scarlet Witch, Hawkeye, and Century. While U.S. Agent does not appear in the series, he does appear in the eight-issue adaptation of the cartoon. Shortly after the characters were written out of the series, Force Works was canceled at issue #22 (April 1996).

References

External links
 Force Works I at Marvel Wiki
 Force Works II at Marvel Wiki
 
 
 

Avengers (comics) titles
Characters created by Andy Lanning
Characters created by Dan Abnett
Comics by Andy Lanning
Comics by Dan Abnett
Iron Man titles
Marvel Comics superhero teams